Hopkins and Brother Store is a historic commercial building located at Onancock, Accomack County, Virginia. It is a simple frame structure consisting of a two-storey block with a slightly lower two-storey ell and lean-to.  The building features corner pilasters, a bracketed cornice, and one "Gothic" window in the attic.  Hopkins and Brother was founded in 1842 by Captain Stephen Hopkins. The business remained in the hands of the Hopkins family until it was discontinued in 1965. The business served as one of the commercial and maritime trading centers of the Eastern Shore. Detailed records of the store exist from 1839 to 1965 and have been donated to the Virginia Historical Society.

It was added to the National Register of Historic Places in 1969.  It is located in the Onancock Historic District.

References

Commercial buildings on the National Register of Historic Places in Virginia
Commercial buildings completed in 1842
National Register of Historic Places in Accomack County, Virginia
Individually listed contributing properties to historic districts on the National Register in Virginia
1842 establishments in Virginia